Walter Remy Dray (March 21, 1886 in Peoria, Illinois – April 1, 1973 in Yorkville, Illinois) was an American track and field athlete who competed in the 1904 Summer Olympics. Dray attended Yale University, where he was the captain of the track team. He held the world record in pole vault three separate times. In 1904 he was sixth in pole vault competition. He died in Yorkville, Illinois, aged 87.

References

External links

1886 births
1973 deaths
American male pole vaulters
Olympic track and field athletes of the United States
Athletes (track and field) at the 1904 Summer Olympics
Sportspeople from Peoria, Illinois
Track and field athletes from Illinois
Yale Bulldogs men's track and field athletes
19th-century American people
20th-century American people